Mount Moriah is an American folk band consisting of lead vocalist Heather "H.C." McEntire, guitarist Jenks Miller, and bassist Casey Toll.

Discography
Mount Moriah (2011, Holidays For Quince Records)
Miracle Temple (2013, Merge Records)
How to Dance (2016, Merge Records)

References

Musical groups established in 2011
2011 establishments in the United States